The EDU European Darts Championship is an electronic soft-tip darts tournament held at various locations in Europe. First edition of this tournament took place in 1996 at the Brig venue in Switzerland. Championship tournaments are organized together with many other open-level tournaments in one week.

The most successful player at this tournament is Boris Krčmar from Croatia.

Classic tournaments

Men's singles

Women's singles

Boys singles (U18)

Cricket tournaments

Men's singles

Women's singles

References

Darts tournaments
1996 establishments in Europe